Īvande Parish is an administrative unit of Kuldīga Municipality in the Courland region of Latvia. The parish had a population of 399 on 1 July 2010 and covers an area of 71.11 km2.

Villages of Īvande parish 
 Apuze
 Īvande
 Mazīvande

See also 
 Īvande Manor

External links 
 Īvande parish in Latvian

Parishes of Latvia
Kuldīga Municipality
Courland